Mutiny on the Bounty is a 1932 novel by Charles Nordhoff and James Norman Hall, based on the mutiny against Lieutenant William Bligh, commanding officer of the Bounty in 1789. It has been made into several films and a musical. It was the first of what became The Bounty Trilogy, which continues with Men Against the Sea, and concludes with Pitcairn's Island.

Plot introduction
The novel tells the story through a fictional first-person narrator by the name of Roger Byam, based on a crew member Peter Heywood. Byam, although not one of the mutineers, remains with the Bounty after the mutiny. He subsequently returns to Tahiti, and is eventually arrested and taken back to England to face a court-martial.  He and several other members of the crew are eventually acquitted.

Characters in Mutiny on the Bounty
Roger Byam – main protagonist, loosely based on life of midshipman Peter Heywood; but with differences-in the book it is claimed that Byam's only living relative was his mother who died of shock after William Bligh had accused her son of being an active mutineer; in fact Heywood had several siblings; his mother survived his court-martial- although his sister Nessy Heywood did die a year after his acquittal
William Bligh – Lieutenant and commander of the Bounty
Fletcher Christian – eventual mutineer

Film, TV and theatrical adaptations
Mutiny on the Bounty (1935)
Mutiny on the Bounty (1962)
The Bounty (1984)
A musical based on the same story appeared in the West End during the 1980s. It was written by and starred David Essex.

Other
An earlier novel, Les Révoltés de la Bounty (The Mutineers of the Bounty), was published by Jules Verne in 1879.

See also

1932 in literature

References

Further reading
 Caroline Alexander, The Bounty: The True Story of the Mutiny on the Bounty, Viking Penguin,  2003, hardcover, 512 pages, 
William Bligh, A Narrative of the Mutiny on board His Majesty's ship Bounty; and the subsequent voyage of part of the crew, in the ship's boat, from Tofoa, one of the Friendly Islands, to Timor, a Dutch Settlement in the East-Indies., London, 1790–94.
Karl Ernst Alwyn Lorbach, 'Conspiracy on the Bounty: Bligh's Convenient Mutiny', printed University of Queensland, 2012, hardcover/Kindle/ePub, 366 pages, .

External links
 
 Commentary on the novel and how it influenced the film(s) and popular perception of the events; comparison between three of the films.

1932 American novels
American novels adapted into films
Collaborative novels
Little, Brown and Company books
Novels about HMS Bounty
Novels set in Tahiti